David Henry George Lascelles, 8th Earl of Harewood (born 21 October 1950), styled as Viscount Lascelles until 2011, is a British hereditary peer and film and television producer. He is a second cousin of Charles III and a great-grandson of George V.

Biography
Lord Harewood was born at his parents' London house, 2 Orme Square, Bayswater, London, the eldest son of the 7th Earl of Harewood and his first wife, Marion Stein. He was baptised at All Saints' Church, Harewood. His father was a first cousin of Queen Elizabeth II. His godparents were The Princess Elizabeth, Duchess of Edinburgh (later Queen Elizabeth II), his great-grandmother Queen Mary, Viscountess Boyne, Benjamin Britten and his uncle Gerald Lascelles. At the time of his birth, he was 13th in line to the throne.

On 12 February 1979 at St Mary's Church, Paddington, London, he married Margaret Rosalind Messenger (born 15 April 1948 in Cheltenham), daughter of Edgar Frank Messenger and Margaret Alice Black: they were divorced in 1989. At one time, she was employed as a laboratory assistant at the University of Bristol.  Their children are:

Emily Tsering Shard (born 23 November 1975 in Bath). She is unable to bear the courtesy title of Lady as her parents were not married at the time of her birth. She obtained Royal Consent from the Privy Council to marry Matthew Shard on 12 February 2008. Emily and her husband are the parents of twins, Isaac and Ida (born 2009), and Otis (born 2011).
Benjamin George Lascelles (born 19 September 1978 in Bath), a conservationist. Although he is Lord Harewood's eldest son, he is unable to inherit his father's titles as his parents were not married at the time of his birth. He obtained Royal Consent from the Privy Council to marry Colombian Carolina Vélez Robledo on 18 April 2009 at Harewood House. The couple have a son, Mateo, born in January 2013. 
Alexander Edgar Lascelles, Viscount Lascelles (born 13 May 1980 in Bath). He is a chef and heir-apparent to the earldom. He has a son, Leo Cyrus Anthony Lascelles (born 22 March 2008), by his ex-girlfriend Laleh Yeganegy (born 1980). Married Annika Reed (born September 1984) on 18 August 2017 at Kew Gardens, London. Their daughter Ivy was born in October 2018.
Hon. Edward David Lascelles (born 19 November 1982 in Bath). Edward Lascelles, obtained Royal Consent to marry Sophie Cartlidge, on 2 August 2014 in Harewood House. They welcomed their son Sebastian Lascelles in August 2020.

On 11 March 1990, he married Diane Jane Howse (born 9 November 1956 in Leafield), now the Countess of Harewood.

Lascelles succeeded to the Earldom of Harewood on the death of his father in July 2011. As Earl of Harewood he continues the tradition begun by his father in 1961 by serving as the honorary lifetime president of Leeds United Football Club.

Filmography
The Earl of Harewood is a film and television producer. His work includes:

References

RootsAndLeaves.com, Genealogy and Family History – Lascelles (Harewood) Family

External links
 

1950 births
Living people
British film producers
British people of Austrian-Jewish descent
8
David
People educated at The Hall School, Hampstead